Crimisus or Crinisus is an ancient Greek river name in Sicily. The name was derived from Crinisus and it corresponds either to the modern Freddo or Caltabellota on northwest Sicily. The western river starts from Monte Busecchio near Calatafimi and the eastern river from the Gola di Sorice near Alcamo. The two rivers are also traditionally called the "hot river" (western) and the "cold river" (eastern) and in Italian language the Crinisus is called Fiume Freddo that means cold river.

References 

Rivers of Italy
Crinisus
Rivers of the Province of Trapani